Claire Antonia Polosak (born 7 April 1988) is an Australian cricket umpire. Polosak is a school teacher by profession. In January 2017, she was one of the four female umpires named by the ICC to stand in matches in the 2017 Women's Cricket World Cup Qualifier.

On 8 October 2017, she became the first woman to stand as an on-field umpire in a men's domestic fixture in Australia, when she was one of the umpires in the match between New South Wales and Cricket Australia XI in the 2017–18 JLT One-Day Cup.  On 11 January 2018, she became the first woman to umpire a match involving the England men's cricket team, when she stood in a one-day warm up match between England and a Cricket Australia XI.

In October 2018, she was named as one of the twelve on-field umpires for the 2018 ICC Women's World Twenty20. In April 2019, she was named as one of the eight on-field umpires for the 2019 ICC World Cricket League Division Two tournament in Namibia. She was appointed as one of the on-field umpires for the final, becoming the first woman to stand in a men's One Day International (ODI) match. In May 2019, the International Cricket Council named her as one of the eight women on the ICC Development Panel of Umpires. In August 2019, she was named as one of the umpires to officiate in matches during the 2019 ICC Women's World Twenty20 Qualifier tournament in Scotland. In February 2020, the ICC named her as one of the umpires to officiate in matches during the 2020 ICC Women's T20 World Cup in Australia.

On 28 November 2020, Polosak and Eloise Sheridan were the on-field umpires for the final of the 2020–21 Women's Big Bash League season, the first time two female umpires officiated in a national final. She became the first female to be involved as an umpire in a men’s Test match in January 2021, when she stood as the fourth umpire in the third Test on India's tour to Australia in 2020–21.

In February 2022, she was named as one of the on-field umpires for the 2022 Women's Cricket World Cup in New Zealand. On 9 September 2022, she stood in her first Twenty20 International (T20I) match on 9 September 2022, between Cook Islands and Samoa.

See also
 List of One Day International cricket umpires

References

1988 births
Living people
Women cricket umpires
Australian Test cricket umpires
Australian One Day International cricket umpires
Australian Twenty20 International cricket umpires
Australian schoolteachers
Australian women referees and umpires